Myotis nipalensis commonly known as Nepal myotis is a vesper bat of genus Myotis.

Description
It has a small ear and long narrow tragus.
It has dense pelage the dorsal pelage is basally dark and dark tipped, ventral pelage is also dark but with paler tips.

Reproduction
They reproduce once a year giving birth to a single offspring.

Distribution
They are endemic to Asia and are found from Iran to Siberia.

Habitat
They are found in both high and low altitude regions. They inhabit a variety of habitats including arid regions mountainous regions and forests.

Diet
They mainly fest on lepidopterans. They hunt at dusk.

Subspecies
Mammal Species of the World lists three subspecies:
Myotis nipalensis nipalensis    (Dobson, 1871)
Myotis nipalensis przewalskii   (Bobrinski, 1926)
Myotis nipalensis transcaspicus (Ognev & Heptner, 1928)

References

Mouse-eared bats
Mammals of Nepal
Mammals described in 1871
Taxa named by George Edward Dobson